Velleda bassamensis is a species of beetle in the family Cerambycidae. It was described by Stephan von Breuning in 1936. It is known from the Ivory Coast and Ghana.

References

Phrissomini
Beetles described in 1936